The men's and women's tournaments for 3x3 basketball were played at the 2019 Pacific Games on 18–20 July 2019 at the Faleata Sports Complex in Apia, Samoa. The 3x3 format of the game had been introduced to the Pacific Mini Games in 2017, but this was the first time it had been contested at the main Pacific Games.

Medal summary

Medal table

Results

Men's tournament
Twelve men's 3x3 teams were placed into two pools based on overall National Federation rankings from FIBA as of 1 June 2019. Ten national federations had an existing Oceania zone ranking although two of them, Northern Marianas ranked third and Tonga ranked seventh, did not participate in this Pacific Games tournament.

For the participating teams, the first and fourth best by rank were seeded in Pool A. The second and third best were seeded in Pool B. The remaining positions in each pool were drawn from the lower ranked and unranked teams. The pools and teams (with FIBA zone ranking shown in brackets) are listed below:

Pool A
  (1)
  (5)
  (9)
  (10)
  (n/a)
  (n/a)

Pool B
  (2)
  (4)
  (6)
  (8)
  (n/a)
  (n/a)

Men's 3x3 players
Players on each team, sorted alphabetically by surname, are listed in the table below.

Source: FIBA 3x3 (Archived)

Preliminary round
Pool A

Pool B

Knockout round

Source: FIBA 3x3 (Archived)

Women's tournament
Thirteen women's 3x3 teams were seeded into two pools based on overall National Federation rankings from FIBA as of 1 June 2019. Ten national federations had an existing Oceania zone ranking although two of them, Northern Marianas ranked third and Tonga ranked seventh, did not participate in this Pacific Games tournament.

For the participating teams, the first and fourth best by rank were seeded in Pool A. The second and third best were seeded in Pool B. The remaining positions in each pool were drawn from the lower ranked and unranked teams. The pools and teams (with FIBA zone ranking shown in brackets) are listed below:

Pool A
  (1)
  (5)
  (6)
  (9)
  (n/a)
  (n/a)
  (n/a)

Pool B
  (2)
  (4)
  (8)
  (10)
  (n/a)
  (n/a)

Women's 3x3 players
Players on each team, sorted alphabetically by surname, are listed in the table below.

Source: FIBA 3x3 (Archived)

Preliminary stage
Pool A

Pool B

Knockout stage

Source: FIBA 3x3 (Archived)

See also
 Basketball at the 2019 Pacific Games
 Basketball at the Pacific Games

References

Basketball at the 2019 Pacific Games
Pacific Games
Pacific Games